The Three Faces of Yusef Lateef is an album by multi-instrumentalist Yusef Lateef recorded in 1960 and released on the Riverside label.

Reception

The Allmusic review by Stacia Proefrock states: "Not quite as expansive or daring as much of Lateef's other recordings, The Three Faces of Yusef Lateef still documents a fine musician at work during the peak of his career".

Track listing 
All compositions by Yusef Lateef except as indicated
 "Goin' Home" (Antonín Dvořák, William Arms Fisher) - 5:02
 "I'm Just a Lucky So-and-So" (Duke Ellington, Mack David) - 4:35
 "Quarantine" (Abe Woodley) - 7:00
 "From Within" - 4:11
 "Salt Water Blues" - 6:47
 "Lateef Minor 7th" (Joe Zawinul) - 4:58
 "Adoration" - 4:31
 "Ma (He's Making Eyes at Me)" (Sidney Clare, Con Conrad) - 4:56

Personnel 
Yusef Lateef - tenor saxophone (tracks 1, 3 & 8), oboe (tracks 2 & 5), flute (tracks 4, 6 & 7)
Hugh Lawson - piano, celeste
Ron Carter - cello (tracks 1, 2 & 4-7)
Herman Wright - bass
Lex Humphries - drums, timpani

References 

Yusef Lateef albums
1960 albums
Albums produced by Orrin Keepnews
Riverside Records albums